Elm Creek Township may refer to the following townships in the United States:

 Elm Creek Township, Martin County, Minnesota
 Elm Creek Township, Buffalo County, Nebraska